In most polls (surveys) for the Senate, a respondent is given the option to give up to 12 names.

Voting preferences per candidate

In this table, the people that are in the top twelve are boldfaced, while those within the margin of error are italicized.

Until filing of candidacies

Until the campaign period

Campaign period

Seats won
In this table, the first figure are seat totals within the top twelve; if a party has any of its members within the margin of error of the twelfth-placed candidate, it is denoted by the second figure inside the parenthesis. Parties that won the majority  (7 or more) of the seats contested are boldfaced; those which had the plurality of seats are italicized.

Senate composition
In this table, the first figure are seat totals within the top twelve; if a party has any of its members within the margin of error of the twelfth-placed candidate, it is denoted by the second figure inside the parenthesis. Parties that won the majority  (13 or more) of the seats contested are boldfaced; those which had the plurality of seats are italicized.

References

2016 Philippine general election
2016
Philippines